UTair Express was a Russian regional airline headquartered in Syktyvkar, Komi, and a subsidiary of UTair Aviation. Its main base was Syktyvkar Airport. It ceased operations on 10 June 2015.

History 
UTair Express' predecessor Komiinteravia was established in March 1996 and started operations in July 1997. 

In 2004 UTair gained control of more than 70% of Komiinteravia. UTair planned to set up a new regional division using its subsidiary Komiinteravia that was to operate as UTair Express using Antonov An-24 and ATR 42-300 aircraft. It planned to replace its Komiinteravia's An-24 fleet with additional ATR 42-300s over the next few years.

UTair Express completed registration in December 2006 and emerged from the reorganization of Komiinteravia. The airline received a certificate in commercial air transport operations on Antonov An-24 aircraft. As soon as all of the An-24s have been decommissioned according to the airline's plan, UTair's air fleet will include up to 20 ATR 42 aircraft. UTair Express also embraces Russia's largest Tupolev Tu-134 maintenance center.

On 10 June 2015, Russian authorities suspended the airline's operating license until further notice due to a request filed by UTair itself. The fleet and route network will be transferred to UTair Aviation until further notice as part of restructuring arrangements.

Destinations

UTair Express operated scheduled flights to the following destinations as of April 2014:

Vilnius – Vilnius International Airport

Arkhangelsk Oblast
Arkhangelsk – Talagi Airport 
 Nenets Autonomous Okrug
Naryan-Mar – Naryan-Mar Airport
 Bashkortostan
Ufa – Ufa International Airport
 Kirov Oblast
Kirov – Pobedilovo Airport
 Komi
Syktyvkar – Syktyvkar Airport
Ukhta – Ukhta Airport
Usinsk – Usinsk Airport
Ust-Tsylma – Ust-Tsylma Airport
Vorkuta – Vorkuta Airport

Anapa – Vityazevo Airport seasonal
Sochi – Adler-Sochi International Airport seasonal

Kursk – Kursk Vostochny Airport 
 Moscow /  Moscow Oblast
Moscow – Vnukovo International Airport
 Nizhny Novgorod Oblast
Nizhny Novgorod – Strigino Airport

Novosibirsk – Tolmachevo Airport

Omsk – Omsk Tsentralny Airport

Samara – Kurumoch Airport 

Yekaterinburg – Koltsovo Airport 

Tambov – Tambov Airport 
 Tatarstan 
Kazan – Kazan

Tyumen – Roshchino Airport 

Beloyarsky – Beloyarsk Airport
Khanty-Mansiysk – Khanty-Mansiysk Airport
Nizhnevartovsk – Nizhnevartovsk Airport
Nyagan – Nyagan Airport
Sovetsky – Sovetsky Airport
Surgut – Surgut International Airport

Novy Urengoy – Novy Urengoy Airport

Ulyanovsk – Ulyanovsk Baratayevka Airport

Voronezh – Chertovitskoye Airport

Fleet 
As of April, 2014, UTair Express operated following aircraft types:

References

External links

Defunct airlines of Russia
Airlines established in 2006
Airlines disestablished in 2015
Companies based in Syktyvkar